Carro Armato (armored vehicle) was the Italian Army's designation for tanks from 1938. This would be followed by a letter and a series of numbers. The letter would be either L, M or P meaning light, medium, and heavy tank respectively. The official Italian military tank classification differed from contemporary classifications in other countries. The numbers would follow the pattern of X/Y where X would be the weight in tonnes and Y the year of adoption (i.e. the L6/40 weighs 6 tonnes and was adopted in the year 1940). The following are some Carro Armatos that entered service:
 Carro Armato L5/21: Fiat L5/21 light tank
 Carro Armato L5/30: Fiat L5/30 light tank
 Carro Armato L6/40: Fiat L6/40 light tank
 Carro Armato M11/39: Fiat M11/39 medium tank
 Carro Armato M13/40: Fiat M13/40 medium tank
 Carro Armato M14/41: Fiat M14/41 medium tank
 Carro Armato M15/42: Fiat M15/42 medium tank
 Carro Armato P40: Fiat P26/40 heavy tank

NOTE:  The L3/33 and the L3/35 tankettes were designated "Fast Tank" (Carro Veloce) and were initially known as the CV-33 and the CV-35.

External links 

Italy's vehicle history
Italian Armored Vehicles
Comando Supremo: Armor

Tanks of Italy
Italian Army